Carlos Ricardo Brathwaite (born 18 July 1988) is a cricketer from Barbados and a former captain of the West Indies Twenty20 International (T20I) team.

International career
Brathwaite made his T20I debut for the West Indies against Bangladesh on 11 October 2011. He made his One Day International debut seven days later in the same series.

He made his Test debut for the West Indies in the Second Test against Australia at the Melbourne Cricket Ground on 26 December 2015.

Needing 19 to win in the last over of the 2016 ICC World Twenty20 final against England, Brathwaite hit four consecutive sixes in the first four balls of the over to enable the West Indies to win their second World Twenty20 title. This was his debut World Cup. He was the first player for the West Indies to hit four consecutive sixes in a T20I match.

In August 2016, Brathwaite was named the captain of the West Indies team for their Twenty20 International matches against India in Florida later that month.

On 8 March 2018, during the 2018 Cricket World Cup Qualifier match against Papua New Guinea at the Old Hararians in Harare, Brathwaite took his first five-wicket haul in ODIs.

In April 2019, he was named in the West Indies' squad for the 2019 Cricket World Cup. On 22 June 2019, in the match against New Zealand, Brathwaite scored his first century in ODIs.  He was caught on the boundary for what would have been a match-winning six.

Domestic and T20 franchise career
In April 2016, he made his Indian Premier League (IPL) debut for Delhi Daredevils. He spent a number of years playing domestic cricket in Ireland, with Dublin-based Leinster Cricket Club, and in 2009 he won the Bob Kerr Irish Senior Cup, defeating Donemena CC in the final.

In January 2018, he was bought by Sunrisers Hyderabad in the 2018 IPL auction and in May was signed by Kent County Cricket Club to play in the 2018 Vitality Blast tournament in England.

In October 2018, Cricket West Indies (CWI) awarded him a white-ball contract for the 2018–19 season. Later the same month,  he was named in the squad for Khulna Titans following the draft for the 2018–19 Bangladesh Premier League and in October captained Combined Campuses and Colleges to their first Regional Super 50 title. In December 2018, he was bought by Kolkata Knight Riders for the 2019 Indian Premier League.

In October 2019, Brathwaite was again named as captain of Combined Campuses for the 2019–20 Regional Super50 tournament. In July 2020, he was named in the Jamaica Tallawahs squad for the 2020 Caribbean Premier League and in October was drafted by the Dambulla Viiking for the inaugural edition of the Lanka Premier League.

Brathwaite signed for Birmingham Bears for the 2021 T20 Blast and in July 2022 was signed by the Kandy Falcons for the 2022 Lanka Premier League.

Personal life
Carlos Brathwaite married his longtime girlfriend Jessica Felix in June 2018. The couple have a daughter.

References

External links
 

1988 births
Living people
People from Christ Church, Barbados
West Indies Test cricketers
West Indies One Day International cricketers
West Indies Twenty20 International cricketers
Cricketers at the 2019 Cricket World Cup
Antigua Hawksbills cricketers
Barbadian cricketers
Barbados cricketers
Barbados Royals cricketers
Combined Campuses and Colleges cricketers
Delhi Capitals cricketers
Jamaica Tallawahs cricketers
Kent cricketers
Khulna Tigers cricketers
Kolkata Knight Riders cricketers
Lahore Qalandars cricketers
Manchester Originals cricketers
Multan Sultans cricketers
Peshawar Zalmi cricketers
Quetta Gladiators cricketers
St Kitts and Nevis Patriots cricketers
Sunrisers Hyderabad cricketers
Sydney Sixers cricketers
Sydney Thunder cricketers
Warwickshire cricketers